Mukundapur is a neighbourhood of East Kolkata in the Indian state of West Bengal.

Geography

Police district
Purba Jadavpur police station is part of the East division of Kolkata Police. It is located at 305, Mukundapur Main Road, Kolkata-700 099.

Jadavpur, Thakurpukur, Behala, Purba Jadavpur, Tiljala, Regent Park, Metiabruz, Nadial and Kasba police stations were transferred from South 24 Parganas to Kolkata in 2011. Except Metiabruz, all the police stations were split into two. The new police stations are Parnasree, Haridevpur, Garfa, Patuli, Survey Park, Pragati Maidan, Bansdroni and Rajabagan.

Economy
Metro Cash and Carry, established a branch at Kolkata in 2008 on EM Bypass. The wholesale centre serves traders, hotels, restaurants, caterers and small businesses across the city.

Luxury Residential Properties
Mukundapur has been witnessing a property development boom. Compared with other neighbourhoods of Kolkata, prices are in the mid/higher mid range and has been going up steadily.

Utalika Luxury ~ The Condoville and Utalika Efficiency and Comfort, an Ambuja Neotia  Luxury project is currently under construction. It is a premier luxury housing complex of more than 1000 simplex, duplex, penthouse (triplex) apartments in 6 Buildings (namely: Prathama, Dwitiya, Tritiya, Chaturthi, Panchami and Efficiency & Comfort) and 2 private ponds, at Mukundapur. The towers are 25 storied tall, having surrounded by schools like South Point School  and Birla High School at Mukundapur, institutes, hospitals, star hotels, restaurants, department stores and malls; just off EM Bypass, it is located right behind AMRI, RN Tagore and BHS Mukundapur. The Future development zone consisting of a partly residential and partly commercial towers with facilities such as residential apartments, retail, offices, hotel, serviced apartments, club, banquets, restaurants, lounge bar, sporting and leisure facilities, time share units, spa and fitness center are also supposed to come up.

Bengal Peerless Housing Development Company, a joint venture company of West Bengal Housing Board and Peerless General Finance and Investment Company Limited has already constructed Avidipta Phase I, a large complex of 1,068 apartments in 15 blocks, at Mukundapur. As of 2018, the company is launching Avidipta II HIG, consisting of 2 forty-six storied towers and Avidipta II MIG (G+29).

Transport
Jyotirindra Nath Nandi metro station, under construction on the Kavi Subhas-Biman Bandar route (Kolkata Metro Line 6), would serve Mukundapur, Santoshpur, Ajoy Nagar and Survey Park areas lying close to the E.M. Bypass section of the city. It has been named in honour of the Bengali writer Jyotirindranath Nandi. Besides Satyajit Ray metro station (named in honour of the Bengali film-director Satyajit Ray) would also serve these areas.

Commute by Car
AIRPORT
 21 km (55 min) from Netaji Subhas Chandra Bose International Airport
MALLS
 100 m (1 min) from Metro Cash & Carry
 1 km (5 min) from Metropolis Mall
 4 km (15 mins) from Acropolis Mall
 5 km (20 mins) from South City Mall
 8 km (30 mins) from Quest Mall
 10 km (32 min) from Forum Mall
 11 km (35 min) from Mani Square
 13 km (40 min) from City Center-1
HOSPITALS
 100 m (1 min) from Rabindranath Tagore International Institute of Cardiac Sciences
 100 m (1 min) from AMRI Hospital
 100 m (1 min) from  Medica Super Speciality Hospital
 100 m (1 min) from Aditya Birla Sankara Nethralaya
 2 km (10 mins) from  Peerless Hospital
 3 km (12 mins) from Ruby General Hospital
 3.5 km (13 mins) from Fortis Hospital
 3.2 km (13 mins) from Desun Hospital And Heart Institute
 10 km (32 mins) from Apollo Multispeciality Hospitals
 11 km (35 mins) from Woodlands Multispeciality Hospital
SCHOOLS
 100 m (1 min) from Birla High School
 200 m (2 min) from South Point School
 3.5 km (12 min) from Calcutta International School
 3.5 m (12 min) from The Heritage School, Kolkata
 4 km (13 min) from Delhi Public School (DPS) Ruby Park
 4.5 km (14 min) from Garden High School
 5 km (20 mins) from South City International School

Healthcare

Mukundapur has developed as a hospital neighbourhood, with a number of varied medical facilities:
Rabindranath Tagore International Institute of Cardiac Sciences, a unit of Narayana Health group, established in 2000, is a 500-bed multi-specialty hospital.
Apollo Hospitals launched a platform Ask Apollo to book an instant appointment online with the doctors in Kolkata at Apollo Gleneagles Hospitals Kolkata. It is a 510-bed hospital including a 50-bedded surgical unit.
Medica Superspecialty Hospital, Kolkata, established in 2010, is a 500-bed tertiary care hospital with the latest medical care facilities.
AMRI Hospital, earlier known as Vision Care Hospital, was established in 1962, as a 150-bed multi-speciality hospital.
Sankara Nethralaya, Kolkata, an eye hospital, was established in 1978.

References

External links
 – it includes a list of guest houses in Mukundapur

Neighbourhoods in Kolkata